Ortegal is a comarca in the north of the Galician Province of A Coruña, Spain. It borders the Atlantic Ocean and the Cantabrian Sea to the north, the Province of Lugo to the east, the comarca of O Eume to the south, and comarca of Ferrol to the west. It covers an area of 394.3 sq.km, which accounts for 1.33% of all the land area in Galicia. The overall population of this region was 13,916 at the 2011 census; the latest official estimate (as at the start of 2018) was 12,238.

Municipalities
The comarca comprises the following four municipalities:

References

Comarcas of the Province of A Coruña